is a Japanese former water polo player who competed on the Japanese men's team in the 1968 Summer Olympics.  The team did not win a medal.

References

1945 births
Living people
Japanese male water polo players
Olympic water polo players of Japan
Water polo players at the 1968 Summer Olympics
Asian Games medalists in water polo
Water polo players at the 1966 Asian Games
Asian Games gold medalists for Japan
Medalists at the 1966 Asian Games
20th-century Japanese people
21st-century Japanese people